Watsessing may refer to the following in the U.S. state of New Jersey:

Watsessing, New Jersey, a neighborhood and census-designated place in Bloomfield, Essex County
Watsessing Park
The Second River (New Jersey), or the Watsessing River, a tributary of the Passaic River
Watsessing Avenue station, a New Jersey Transit rail station